Daniel Svensson (born 20 November 1977) is a Swedish drummer. He is currently a member of the Swedish supergroup The Halo Effect (2021–) and formerly a drummer of the metal bands In Flames, Sacrilege GBG (also the vocalist) and Diabolique.

In 1998, Svensson took Björn Gelotte's job occupation as drummer when Gelotte switched from drums to guitars.  In Flames' first album with him as drummer along with Peter Iwers was Colony, and it was released the following year. He rejoined Sacrilege GBG in 2006. Svensson decided to leave In Flames after finishing up the Europe tour in November 2015. He now brews beer at his brewery outside Gothenburg, Odd Island Brewing, together with former In Flames bandmate Peter Iwers, among others.

Svensson is a self-taught drummer. He looks up to Vinnie Paul of Pantera as a big influence on his playing.

Equipment 

Drums – Tama Starclassic Maple/Bubinga, Piano White
12"×9" Maple Tom
13"×10" Maple Tom
16"×16" Maple Floor Tom
18"×16" Maple Floor Tom
22"×16" Bubinga Bass Drum (×2)
14"×5.5" Bubinga Snare Drum
Cymbals – Meinl
14" MB20 Heavy Soundwave Hi-Hat
17" MB10 Medium Crash
20" MB20 Heavy Crash
18" MB20 Heavy Crash
18" MB20 Rock China
22" MB20 Heavy Bell Ride
12" MB20 Rock Splash
10" MB20 Rock Splash
8" Classics Bell Effect Cymbal
Drum Heads – Evans
Toms – Clear EC2
Bass – Clear EQ3
Snare – Power Center
Hardware – Tama
Tama Speed Cobra double pedal (SOAPF)
Tama Iron Cobra Power-Glide double pedal
Tama Iron Cobra Lever-Glide hi-hat stand
Power Tower Rack System
1st Chair Ergo-Rider Drum Throne
Other
Pro-Mark Millennium II 5A Daniel Svensson signature sticks

Discography

References

External links 

 
 Meinl artist page

1977 births
Living people
People from Gothenburg
Swedish heavy metal drummers
Swedish heavy metal singers
21st-century Swedish singers
21st-century drummers
In Flames members
Diabolique (band) members